K² is a progressive rock band from Los Angeles, California. The band is composed of bassist/keyboardist Ken Jaquess (Atlantis, New Cross), keyboardist Ryo Okumoto (Spock's Beard, Natalie Cole), drummer Doug Sanborn (the Untouchables), electric violinist Yvette Devereaux, singer Shaun Guerin, guitarist Allan Holdsworth (Tempest, Soft Machine, Gong and U.K.) and guitarist John Miner (Art Rock Circus, Mantra Sunrise).

History 
K² was founded by Ken Jaquess. When Jaquess' previous group, Atlantis. disbanded in 2000, he was left with a full album's worth of new material that was originally to become Atlantis' third album. The untitled project needed a new vehicle, and Jaquess decided to take the advice of an old friend and finally produce a solo album. Picking the moniker "K-Squared" or "K²", he embarked on a journey that would last four years and would eventually end with the release of K²'s first album, Book of the Dead.

Formation and first album 
K² began in May 2001 when bassist Ken Jaquess asked drummer Doug Sanborn to contribute to some new music he was working on. Having no idea if anything would come of these sessions, they set out to record a project that would soon take on a life all its own. After only four rehearsals and five hours of recording, Jaquess and Sanborn had laid the foundation for an epic album of high musicianship, complex compositions and haunting themes.

Over the next four years, fellow musicians Allan Holdsworth, Shaun Guerin, Ryo Okumoto, Yvette Devereaux and John Miner added layers of unique, signature sounds that resulted in K²'s first album, Book of the Dead. Sadly, just after recording his vocals, original vocalist Shaun Guerin died.

Critically acclaimed around the world, K² went on to perform BOTD live with a new lineup consisting of Jaquess and Sanborn, Ryo Okumoto (keyboards), Karl Johnson (guitar), and Josh Gleason (vocals). In 2006, K² filmed their first gig, which was released on their 2008 concert DVD, K² Live in Hollywood.

Black Garden 

In 2007, this lineup went back to the drawing board to create what would become their long overdue second release, Black Garden. Released on September 21, 2010 through Magna Carta Records, this outing showcases this modern rock quintet in an entirely new setting. With a central theme of Oceania, K² explores the hidden depths of this mysterious region and take the listener on a dark, sonic journey to places rarely visited, and offers a glimpse of a people unlike any other on earth.

K² followed this release with a short east coast tour that saw the band gaining new fans and appreciation, with an amazing gig in Boston that was the high point of the tour.

Third album 
After the tour, writing and recording of new material commenced with a couple of epics and some shorter songs working their way through the band. During this time, vocalist Brent George and guitarist Steve Poloni came on board. With this lineup change it was decided to head back out on the road, this time to Europe. K²'s 2012 European tour was an amazing experience for the whole band, making new friends and adding more fans with each stop. It proved to be a resounding success for K², playing all over England and ending in the Netherlands. A DVD of their concert was filmed in Rotterdam at the iO Pages Festival during the tour. Originally meant to be a bonus disc for their third album, it came out better than expected and was released as a separate DVD on September 15, 2015.

K² were finishing the recording of their untitled third album, ad hoping for another tour to follow in 2020.

Musical style 

K²'s music is characterized by skilled musicianship, odd-numbered time signatures, mixed meters and unusually varied keyboard, bass and drum interplay, with an emphasis on darker, symphonic compositions.

Members 
Current members
 Ken Jaquess – bass guitar, keyboards (2001–present)
 Ryo Okumoto – keyboards (2002–present)
 Steve Poloni – guitar (2012–present)
 Doug Sanborn – drums, percussion (2001–present)

Former members
 Brent George – vocals (2012-2014)
 Josh Gleason – vocals (2005–2011)
 Shaun Guerin – vocals (2004)
 Allan Holdsworth – guitar (2004)
 Karl Johnson – guitar (2005–2011)
 John Miner – guitar (2004)

Session musicians
 Allan Holdsworth: guitar (2004)
 Yvette Devereaux: electric violin (2004)
 John Miner: guitar (2004)

Discography 
Studio albums
 Book of the Dead (2005)
 Black Garden (2010)
   
DVDs
 K²-Live In Hollywood (2008)
 K²-Live @ iO Pages Festival (2015)

References

External links 
 K² Facebook page
 K² Band page

Musical groups from Los Angeles
Progressive rock musical groups from California